The Beaufort Bridge is a landmark bridge across Padas River in Beaufort District, Sabah, Malaysia. It is maintained by Sabah Public Works Department. It is a truss girder bridge.

Beaufort District
Truss bridges
Bridges in Sabah